The Zaria massacre (also known as Buhari Massacre) was a massacre carried out by the Nigerian Army in Zaria, Kaduna State, Nigeria, on Saturday, 12 December 2015, against Shia Muslims, mostly members of the Islamic Movement in Nigeria. At least 1000 civilians were killed, with 347 bodies secretly buried by the army in a masse grave.

The Army claimed that it had responded to an attempt to assassinate Nigeria's Chief of Army Staff, Tukur Buratai, by the Islamic Movement in Nigeria. This claim has been strongly rejected by the Islamic Movement and several human rights organizations who argue that the massacre occurred without any provocation and that all the protestors were unarmed. The incident is considered among the "notable human rights violation since the return to democracy" in Nigeria.

Incident 
Nigerian Army in Zaria, Kaduna State, Nigeria carried out an assault against Shia Muslims, mostly members of the Islamic Movement in Nigeria, on 12 December 2015. The attack left at least 348 civilian killed and some others injured. Ibrahim Zakzaky was injured in the incident and was captured along with his wife and hundreds of other members.

Some of the injured bodies were burned alive, according to the Amnesty International report.

According to the HRW report, Nigeria's government buried the bodies without family members' permission.

Domestic and international reactions

Peaceful protests to condemn the killing of Shia Muslims in Nigeria by the Nigerian army were held in different cities of India, including Mumbai, Chennai, and Hyderabad. Demonstrations were also held in Tehran and Mashhad in Iran.

International 

  The United States of America expressed concern over the killings; stating, "While many details of the incidents...remain unclear, we are dismayed to learn of multiple civilian deaths". The US also called for the Government of Nigeria to "quickly, credibly and transparently investigate" the events.

Investigation

In January 2016, the Kaduna State Government formed the Commission for Judicial Inquiry into the causes of clashes in Zaria between the Islamic Movement in Nigeria and the Nigerian Army in December 2015, under the chairmanship of Justice Mohammed Garba, the presiding justice of the Port Harcourt Division of the Court of Appeal.

Findings

On 1 August 2016, the commission of inquiry found the army gunned down 348 Shia Muslims and urged the prosecution of all those involved in the killings.

See also 

Islamic Movement (Nigeria)
Ibrahim Zakzaky
Zaria Quds Day massacres
Shia Islam in Nigeria
 Anti-Shi'ism
2015-2016 Killing of Biafran Protesters

References

External links 
  of the Islamic Movement (Nigeria)
Islamic Movement In Nigeria
 biography of Sheikh Ibrahim Zakzaky Shia Cleric at Tripod.com

Shia Islam
Violence against Shia Muslims
Zaria massacre
2010s massacres in Nigeria
Zaria massacre
Zaria massacre
Shia Islam in Nigeria
Massacres committed by Nigeria